Anthony D'Alberto (born 13 October 1994) is a Congolese professional footballer who plays as a right-back.

Club career
He made his professional debut in the Segunda Liga for Braga B on 3 October 2015 in a game against Portimonense. He joined R. Charleroi S.C. on loan on 5 January 2018.

Personal life
D'Alberto was born in the Democratic Republic of the Congo, and is of Congolese, Italian, and Belgian descent.

D'Alberto was involved in the car accident alongside Junior Malanda who lost his life, but D'Alberto and one other were rushed to hospital and survived on Saturday afternoon on the 10 January 2015 around 16:00 pm in Porta Westfalica in northern Germany.

References

External links
Soccerway Profile

1994 births
Living people
People from Lubumbashi
Democratic Republic of the Congo footballers
Democratic Republic of the Congo expatriate footballers
Democratic Republic of the Congo people of Italian descent
Democratic Republic of the Congo people of Belgian descent
Association football defenders
R.S.C. Anderlecht players
VVV-Venlo players
R. Charleroi S.C. players
S.C. Braga B players
Moreirense F.C. players
Aarhus Gymnastikforening players
Belgian Pro League players
Liga Portugal 2 players
Primeira Liga players
Danish Superliga players
Democratic Republic of the Congo expatriate sportspeople in the Netherlands
Democratic Republic of the Congo expatriate sportspeople in Portugal
Expatriate footballers in Portugal
Expatriate footballers in the Netherlands
Expatriate men's footballers in Denmark
21st-century Democratic Republic of the Congo people